Reginald Newton Biggs (16 June 1831–10 November 1868) was a New Zealand station manager, soldier and magistrate. He was born in England on 16 June 1831, and was reported in New Zealand as a settler in the area around Whanganui in 1855. From 1862 he was an officer in the Hawke's Bay volunteers and was involved in a number of actions in the New Zealand Wars.  Biggs led the pursuit of Te Kooti, but Te Kooti led an attack on a settlement at Matawhero that killed a number of European settlers, their families, and local Māori. Biggs, his wife, their son and their nurse were amongst those killed on 10 November 1868.

See also
Te Kooti's War

References

1831 births
1868 deaths
District Court of New Zealand judges
English emigrants to New Zealand
Colony of New Zealand judges